Za Za Za is a studio album released in 2004 by DJ Oscar Lobo and his Grupo Climax. This album became their first number-one set on the Billboard Top Latin Albums. The song "El Za Za Za" contains samples of "El Cepillo" by Fulanito.

Track listing
The information from Billboard

Personnel
The album's personnel are:
Oscar Fuentes Atilano — Producer
Rex Navarrete — Arranger
César Martínez — Accordion
Juan Muro — Art Direction, mixing

Chart performance

References

2004 debut albums
Grupo Climax albums